Barely Legal is the debut studio album by Swedish rock band The Hives, from Fagersta, Sweden.

The album's second track, "A.K.A. I-D-I-O-T", had a video produced, but it was not commercially released until it was included as an extra on some pressings of Your New Favourite Band. The band later recorded an EP by the same name.

The album sleeve features three quotations from fake newspaper reviews. These quotations are originally from British newspapers referring to the Aldous Huxley novel Brave New World.

Track listing

Personnel
Howlin' Pelle Almqvist - vocals
Nicholaus Arson - lead guitar/backing vocals
Vigilante Carlstroem – rhythm guitar/backing vocals
Dr. Matt Destruction - bass guitar
Chris Dangerous – drums

References

External links

The Hives albums
1997 debut albums
Burning Heart Records albums